NH 45 may refer to:

 National Highway 45 (India)
 New Hampshire Route 45, United States